Sir George Denys, 1st Baronet (1788–1857), of Blacklands House, Chelsea, Middlesex, was an English politician.

He was a Member (MP) of the Parliament of England for Kingston upon Hull 1812 to 1818.

Arms

References

1788 births
1857 deaths
Baronets in the Baronetage of the United Kingdom
People from Chelsea, London
Politicians from Yorkshire
Members of the Parliament of the United Kingdom for English constituencies
UK MPs 1812–1818